Zakia Hamdani Meghji (born 31 December 1946) is a Tanzanian politician who served as the  first female Minister of Finance from 2006 to 2008. She was the first woman to hold this post.
She also served as a Tourism minister, still the longest serving Tourism Minister in the country, who brought many positive changes in the Ministry.

References

1946 births
Living people
Tanzanian Muslims
Chama Cha Mapinduzi politicians
Members of the National Assembly (Tanzania)
Nominated Tanzanian MPs
Finance Ministers of Tanzania
Female finance ministers
Women government ministers of Tanzania